Secrets of the Hive, by Procol Harum, is a 2-CD best-of album that was released in 2007 to mark the 40th anniversary of their first single, "A Whiter Shade of Pale". The album contains tracks from previous albums (not including The Long Goodbye), singles and the previously unreleased Into the Flood.

Track listing

Disc one

Disc 2

References

External links
 ProcolHarum.com - ProcolHarum.com's page on this album

Procol Harum albums
2007 compilation albums